The Feminist Party can be:

The Feminist Party of Germany
The Feminist Party of Canada (founded 1979, now defunct)
The Feminist Party (United States), short lived vehicle for presidential campaign of Shirley Chisholm, founded by Florynce Kennedy
The Feminist Party (Finland)
An alternative name for several parties called the Feminist Initiative, the Women's Party, or the Women's List.